Artūras Trumpauskas (born 1 May 1972 in Kaunas) is a Lithuanian former professional road and track cyclist. Professional in 2000 and 2001, he represented Lithuania at the 1996 Summer Olympics in the team pursuit event. He also competed at the 2001 UCI Road World Championships.

Major results
1993
 1st Stage 2 (TTT) Tour de Pologne
1997
 3rd Time trial, National Road Championships
1999
 1st Grand Prix de la Ville de Nogent-sur-Oise

References

External links

1972 births
Living people
Lithuanian male cyclists
Olympic cyclists of Lithuania
Cyclists at the 1996 Summer Olympics
Sportspeople from Kaunas